W. A. Scott may refer to:

 Walter A. Scott (1876–1963), mayor of Jackson, Mississippi
 William A. Scott (psychologist) (1926–1991), American-born social psychologist
 William Alexander Scott (born 1940), politician in Bermuda
 William Alphonsus Scott (1871–1921), Irish Roman Catholic architectural historian
 William Amasa Scott (1862–1944), American economist
 William Anderson Scott (1813–1885), Presbyterian minister, author, and educator